The Korean Tour is a men's professional golf tour run by the Korea Professional Golfers' Association (KPGA) of South Korea. In 2011, it had total prize money of about US$14 million.

Professional golf in Korea dates back to the mid 20th century. The Korean Professional Golf Championship and the Korean Open were launched in 1958 and the KPGA was founded in 1963. Various other tournaments were created over the following decades. 

The KPGA's tours serve as feeders for richer tours around the world. Substantial numbers of Korean golfers have played on the Asian Tour and the Japan Golf Tour, and a few have made it onto the PGA Tour or the European Tour. Notable examples include Yang Yong-eun, who was the first Korean to win a men's major golf championship, and K. J. Choi, the first Korean-born PGA Tour winner whose most notable win was the 2011 Players Championship.

In December 2022, it was announced by the European Tour that the KPGA had extended their partnership with them and the PGA Tour. As part of the expansion, the leading player on the Korean Tour Order of Merit was given status onto the European Tour for the following season.

Main tour
In 2011, there were 17 events on the main tour. All these tournament have prize funds of at least 300 million won (approximately US$300,000). Four have prize funds of 1 billion won (US$1 million) while the Ballantine's Championship has a prize fund of 2.2 million euros (approximately US$3.1 million). Total prize money for the tour is approximately 12 billion won (US$12 million).

Until 2011, regular Korean Tour events did not carry Official World Golf Ranking points. The first regular tournament to carry World Rankings Points was the 2011 Twayair Open. Korean Tour events carry a minimum of nine OWGR points for the winner, increased from six in 2016.

Order of Merit winners
The Order of Merit uses a points system, currently called Genesis Points.

2022 Kim Yeong-su
2021 Tom Kim
2020 Kim Tae-hoon
2019 Moon Kyong-jun
2018 Lee Hyung-joon
2017 Choi Jin-ho
2016 Choi Jin-ho
2015 Lee Tae-hee
2014 Kim Seung-hyuk
2013 Ryu Hyun-woo
2012 Lee Sang-hee
2011 Hong Soon-sang
2010 Kim Bi-o
2009 Bae Sang-moon
2008 Kim Hyung-sung
2007 Kim Kyung-tae
2006 Yang Yong-eun
2005 Hur Suk-ho
2004 Yang Yong-eun
2003 K. J. Choi
2002 K. J. Choi
2001 Kang Wook-soon
2000 Kang Wook-soon
1999 Kang Wook-soon
1998 Choi Gwang-soo
1997 K. J. Choi
1996 K. J. Choi
1995 Choi Sang-ho
1994 Choi Sang-ho
1993 Park Nam-sin
1992 Choi Sang-ho
1991 Choi Sang-ho
1990 Lee Kang-sun
1989 Bong Tae-ha
1988 Park Nam-sin
1987 Choi Youn-soo
1986 Choi Sang-ho
1985 Choi Sang-ho
1984 Choi Sang-ho
1983 Choi Sang-ho
1982 Han Chang-sang
1981 Choi Sang-ho
1980 Kim Seung-hack
1979 Han Chang-sang
1978 Cho Tae-woon
Source:

Multiple winners
9 times
Choi Sang-ho: 1981, 1983, 1984, 1985, 1986, 1991, 1992, 1994, 1995
4 times
K. J. Choi: 1996, 1997, 2002, 2003
3 times
Kang Wook-soon:  1999, 2000, 2001
2 times
Han Chang-sang: 1979, 1982
Park Nam-sin: 1988, 1993
Yang Yong-eun: 2004, 2006
Choi Jin-ho: 2016, 2017

Other KPGA tours
The KPGA launched a developmental tour in 1999. In 2007 there are two developmental tours. Both of them consist of two-day, 36-hole tournaments, and the dates of the tours do not clash. The Bear River Tour consists of ten tournaments with prize funds of 60 million won (US$60,000) each, and the SBS Golf Calloway Tour has eight tournaments with prize funds of 40 million won (US$40,000) each. 

The KPGA also runs a senior tour and a series of events for teaching pros. The Korean Senior Open Golf Championship was launched in 1996.

Women's professional golf has a high profile in South Korea, due to the immense international success of Korean women golfers such as Se Ri Pak since the mid-1990s. There is a separate LPGA of Korea Tour for women.

Notes

References

External links
English-language version of official site
Korean professionals Shin Yong Jin and Kim Dae Sub play at the Ballantine's Midnight Cup in Orkney, Scotland, stv feature, 19 June 2007. 

 
Professional golf tours
Golf in South Korea
1963 establishments in South Korea